The 2015 Plymouth City Council election took place on 7 May 2015 to elect members of Plymouth City Council in England.

The Labour Party lost its narrow majority, resulting in no party having overall control.

Background 
Plymouth City Council held local elections on 7 May 2015 along with councils across the United Kingdom as part of the 2015 local elections. The council elects its councillors in thirds, with a third being up for election every year for three years, with no election in the fourth year.

Councillors defending their seats in this election were previously elected in 2011. In that election, twelve Labour candidates and eight Conservative candidates were elected. Two Labour candidates had been elected in St Peter and the Waterfront due to a by-election coinciding with the council election, only one of whom was defending their seat in this election.

Overall results

|-
| colspan=2 style="text-align: right; margin-right: 1em" | Total
| style="text-align: right;" | 19
| colspan=5 |
| style="text-align: right;" | 117,348
| style="text-align: right;" | 

Note: All changes in vote share are in comparison to the corresponding 2011 election.

The Labour Party lost their majority on the council, leaving the council under no overall control.

After the previous election, the  composition of the council was:

After this election, the composition of the council was:

Ward results
Asterisks denote sitting councillors seeking re-election.

Budshead

Compton

Devonport

Drake

Efford and Lipson

Eggbuckland

Ham

Honicknowle

Moor View

Peverell

Plympton Erle

Plympton St Mary

Plymstock Dunstone

Plymstock Radford

Southway

St Budeaux

Stoke

St Peter and the Waterfront

Sutton and Mount Gould

Aftermath
The Labour Party lost control of the council, remaining the largest party with one seat short of an overall majority.

References

2015 English local elections
May 2015 events in the United Kingdom
2015
2010s in Devon